Major Sir Nicholas Gosselin (12 February 1839 – 4 February 1917) was an Irish military officer and intelligence agent.

Life

Gosselin was born in Plymouth, Devon, the second son of Major Nicholas Gosselin of County Cavan, Ireland. He entered the British Army at the age of 16, serving in the 39th (Dorsetshire) Regiment of Foot and the Royal Welch Fusiliers before becoming the adjutant of the Cavan Militia.

He was appointed a resident magistrate in the West of Ireland 1882. In May 1883, he was seconded to the Home Office and given control of the newly formed Special Irish Branch, with the initial remit of gathering intelligence on Fenian organisations operating in Glasgow and northern England.

He remained nominally a magistrate during his time at the Home Office – described officially as "employment on special duty" – but did not carry out any of the associated duties nor was he paid for the post. He retired in 1904 and died in West Mailing, Kent, aged 77.

Family

He married Catherine Paull (1833-1924) daughter of Rev James Paull minister of Tullynessle and Moderator of the General Assembly of the Church of Scotland in 1846.

References

1839 births
1917 deaths
British intelligence operatives
People from County Cavan
British Militia officers
39th Regiment of Foot officers
Royal Welch Fusiliers officers